Randy Brodehl (born October 13, 1954) is an American businessman, former fire chief, and politician from Montana. Brodehl is a former Republican member of the Montana House of Representatives and current Commissioner of Flathead County in Montana.

Early life 
On October 13, 1954, Brodehl was born in Stockton, California.

Education 
In 1987, Brodehl earned a Bachelor of Science degree in Fire Service Management from Western Oregon University.

Career 
On 1985, Brodehl became a Battalion Chief of Corvallis Fire Department in Oregon, until 2001. In 1987, Brodehl became the owner of Brodehl Farms, until 2001.

In 2001, Brodehl became the Fire Chief of Kalispell Fire Department in Kalispell, Montana, until July 2008.

In 2008, Brodehl became the owner of R&J Enterprises, a custom cabinet maker.

On November 2, 2010, Brodehl won the election and became a Republican member of Montana House of Representatives for District 7. Brodehl defeated Karen Reeves with 72.38% of the votes.
On November 6, 2012, as an incumbent, Brodehl won the election and continued serving District 7. Brodehl defeated Diane Frances Taylor-Mahnke with 68.99% of the votes.

In November 2018, Brodehl won the election and became a Commissioner of Flathead County, Montana for District 3.

Personal life 
Brodehl's wife is Joyce Brodehl. They have six children. Brodehl and his family live in Kalispell, Montana.

See also 
 Montana House of Representatives, District 7
 Montana House of Representatives, District 9

References

External links
 Randy Brodehl at ballotpedia.org
brodehlforhd7.com via archive.is
 Randy Brodehl at leg.mt.gov

American fire chiefs
Living people
Republican Party members of the Montana House of Representatives
Politicians from Kalispell, Montana
1954 births